Aotearoa magna is a species of spiders in the Mecysmaucheniidae family. It was first described in 1949 by Forster. , it is the only species in the genus Aotearoa, erected by Forster and Platnick in 1984. It is found in New Zealand.  (The Māori name of the island nation is Aotearoa.)

References

Mecysmaucheniidae
Spiders of New Zealand
Spiders described in 1949